Chowder is an American animated television series created by C. H. Greenblatt for Cartoon Network. The series centers on Chowder, an aspiring young boy who hopes to one day become a professional chef. Chowder is the apprentice of Mung Daal, Chowder's caretaker and seasoned professional chef, who lives with his wife, Truffles, in the bustling community of Marzipan City. Mung Daal's catering company also employs his assistant, Shnitzel, who speaks only in gibberish. The catering company's greatest rival is a business owned by the surreptitious Endive and her junior apprentice, Panini. Panini has a remarkable romantic interest in Chowder despite his repeated attempts to explain that he is not interested in her. Throughout his journey, Chowder also interacts with Gazpacho, a middle-aged fruit salesman who often gives him advice, and his pet Kimchi, a gas cloud who speaks unintelligibly to Chowder.

Chowder ran for a total of 49 episodes (93 segments). The first season, which consists of 20 episodes, premiered on November 2, 2007, with "Burple Nurples/Shnitzel Makes a Deposit", and concluded on July 24, 2008, with "The Apprentice Games". Two more seasons were produced, with the series finale, "Chowder Grows Up", airing on August 7, 2010.

Series overview

Episodes

Season 1 (2007–08)

Season 2 (2008–09)

Season 3 (2009–10)

References

External links
 List of Chowder episodes at TV.com
 List of Chowder episodes at Epguides

 Lists of American children's animated television series episodes
Lists of Cartoon Network television series episodes
 Chowder (TV series)